Erlis Jekshenovich Terdikbayev (born 27 May 1969) is a Kyrgyzstani General and the current Chief of the General Staff of the Armed Forces of Kyrgyzstan.

Early life and education 
Erlis Terdikbayev was born on May 27, 1969 in the village of Issyk-Ata in the Chuy Region of the Kyrgyz SSR. He joined the Soviet Army in 1983, and graduated from the Alma-Ata Higher All-Arms Command School (now the Military Institute of the Kazakh Ground Forces) in 1990 after spending 4 years there as a cadet.

Career 
He served in a regiment of the Soviet Army's Transcaucasian Military District from June 1990 to June 1992. During the 1990s and the 2000s, Terdikbayev served in various military units of the poorly equipped Armed Forces of the Kyrgyz Republic.

He studied at the Combined Arms Academy of the Armed Forces of the Russian Federation and the Military Academy of the General Staff of the Armed Forces of Russia from 2002-2004. In 2017, he was appointed as the commander of the newly formed Kyrgyz Land Forces.

On April 21, 2018, he replaced Colonel Mirbek Kasimkulov as the chairman of the State Committee for Defense Affairs as a result of Prime Minister Sapar Isakov's vote of no confidence by parliament.

He was dismissed on 3 February 2021 with the abolishment of his position. On 29 March, he became the new Chief of the General Staff.

See also 
 Ministry of Defense of the Kyrgyz Republic
 Kyrgyz Army
 Government Website

References 

1969 births
Living people
Government ministers of Kyrgyzstan
People from Chüy Region
Ministers of Defence of Kyrgyzstan
Kyrgyzstani generals